Diplodactylus galaxias, sometimes called the Northern Pilbara beak-faced gecko, is a gecko endemic to Australia.

References

Diplodactylus
Reptiles described in 2010
Taxa named by Paul Doughty
Taxa named by Mitzy Pepper
Taxa named by J. Scott Keogh
Geckos of Australia